Miss World Spain 2015 was the 3rd edition of the Miss World Spain pageant, held on October 25, 2015. The winner was Mireia Lalaguna Royo of Barcelona and she represented Spain in Miss World 2015.

Final results

Special Awards

Official Delegates

Notes

Returns
Last competed in 2011:
 Castile and León
 Lérida
 Navarre

Last competed 2013:
 Gerona
 Granada

Withdrawals
 Aragón
 Cantabria
 Galicia
 Madrid

Did not compete
 Almería
 Araba
 Ávila
 Badajoz
 Burgos
 Cáceres
 Ciudad Real
 Cuenca
 Ceuta
 Guadalajara
 Guipúzcoa
 Huesca
 La Coruña
 La Rioja
 León
 Lugo
 Navarre
 Orense
 Pontevedra
 Salamanca
 Soria
 Teruel
 Toledo
 Valladolid
 Vizcaya
 Zamora
 Zaragoza

References

External links

Miss Spain
2015 in Spain
World Spain